Date is a ghost town in Perkins County, in the U.S. state of South Dakota.

History
A post office called Date was established in 1900, and remained in operation until 1955. The community has the name of Date Peterson, an early settler.

References

Unincorporated communities in Perkins County, South Dakota
Unincorporated communities in South Dakota